Anjuman Shehzadi (1987 – 15 May 2011) was a Pakistani stage and film actress. She was known for her bold dances.

Biography

She started her artistic career from 2000. She worked in more than one hundred stage plays. Her popularity was accounted more for her bold dances than her acting; for which, she was criticized more than her peer actresses. She was cast by renowned producers of the country that led to her rising fame. She appeared in Lollywood films as an item girl and supporting actress.

Death
She died on May 15, 2011 in Lahore under mysterious circumstances.

Filmography

See also
List of unsolved deaths

References

1977 births
2011 deaths
Pakistani female dancers
Pakistani stage actresses
Unsolved deaths